Voodoo Kid is a graphic adventure game published by Infogrames and released in 1997. In April 2021 the game was re-released by Digital Theory Ltd. on GOG and Steam updated to run on more modern systems.

Plot
The unnamed protagonist (who can be chosen to be either a boy or a girl) is magically transported aboard a haunted ship where the player must make his or her way through the vessel and confront Captain Baron Saturday.

The protagonist wakes up in the hold of the ship where they meet Baron Saturday's zombie butler. After the protagonist helps him find Baron Saturday's hat, the butler decides that the protagonist could potentially free the souls captured by the Baron and free the crew. To do so the protagonist needs to assemble the map, which will allow him/her to direct the ship to the land of the living, instead of the island of lost souls, where the Baron is currently sailing. The protagonist proceeds from the hold of the ship to the infirmary, then the kitchen, then the dining room, and finally the deck. Along the way he/she collects the entire map and escapes elemental traps set by the baron by using several loa which turns the protagonist into a spirit like form which he/she uses to deactivate the trap. After changing the course of the ship, the butler reveals that the Baron controls the ship telepathically, and the protagonist has to defeat the Baron to change the course. The protagonist climbs up the mast and frees the souls the Baron has captured before confronting the Baron. The protagonist manages to defeat the Baron using knowledge of the elements. The protagonist then wakes up, the whole adventure seemingly a dream, before the voodoo container of souls the Baron used appears as a reward for the protagonist's bravery.

Reception 

The game received mostly positive reviews

References 

1997 video games
Point-and-click adventure games
Video games developed in France
Video games featuring protagonists of selectable gender
Windows games
Windows-only games
Infogrames games